Alexander George King is an Australian association football referee. He is a full-time referee on the A-League since 2019 and has been an international FIFA referee since 2020.

Biography
Born in Queensland, where he attended Bribie Island State High School, King began refereeing at the age of 13.

King became a fourth official in the A-League in 2014, and the following year he made his debut as a referee in the league by replacing the injured Alan Milliner in the last ten minutes of the match between Wellington Phoenix and Melbourne Victory. He was selected as one of the league's 13 referees for the 2017–18 season.

In September 2019, King was named as one of Football Australia's three full-time referees alongside Chris Beath and Shaun Evans, replacing Jarred Gillett who had moved to England; he had previously worked as a carpenter. At the turn of the year, he was added to the FIFA International Referees List as one of five Australian male referees.

King was appointed to the 2022 AFC Cup Final in Kuala Lumpur, Malaysia, as AVAR2, and was awarded Referee of the Year for the 2021–22 A-League Men season. On 17 December 2022, he was the referee in a Melbourne Derby between Melbourne Victory and Melbourne City, when Victory fans stormed the pitch. He and City goalkeeper Tom Glover received head injuries by being struck with a metal bucket.

King was part of the Asian Football Confederation Referee Academy from 2018–2022, and was selected to officiate at the 2022 AFC U-23 Asian Cup, he was appointed to a single match between Turkmenistan and Iran.

References 

Living people
Sportspeople from Queensland
Australian carpenters
Australian soccer referees
A-League Men referees
Year of birth missing (living people)